The 2020 Liga 2 was the fourth season of the Liga 2 under its current name and the 11th season under its current league structure. The season was suspended on 27 March 2020 due to the COVID-19 pandemic. The season was abandoned and was declared void on 20 January 2021.

Overview

Original format changes 
Major changes occur in the league format this season. The second round, which consisting of eight teams (the best four from each region) will be removed this season. The winner of each region will be immediately promoted and qualified for the final. While the second place in each region will be qualified for the third place playoff and the last promotion place. The season started on 14 March and is scheduled to finish on 3 October 2020.

Teams

Team changes
The following teams have changed division since the 2019 season.

Name changes
 Semeru relocated to Sidoarjo and were renamed to Hizbul Wathan.
 Babel United merged with Muba United into Muba Babel United and relocated to Musi Banyuasin.
 Putra Sinar Giri (PSG Gresik) relocated to Pati and were renamed to Putra Safin Group Pati (PSG Pati).

Personnel and kits
Note: Flags indicate national team as has been defined under FIFA eligibility rules. Players and coaches may hold more than one non-FIFA nationality.

Notes:

 On the front of shirt.
 On the back of shirt.
 On the sleeves.
 On the shorts.

Coaching changes

Preliminary round (Original format before the first abandonment)

West region

East region

Effects of the COVID-19 pandemic 
The season was suspended on 15 March 2020 after finishing the matchday one due to the COVID-19 pandemic. The initial suspension was until the end of March, which was then extended to 29 May.

On 7 August 2020, PT Liga Indonesia Baru made several announcements. The season will be restarted from the beginning with a different format. In the first  round, 24 teams will be drawn into four groups consisting of six teams. All groups will be played a home tournament format where teams play each other once. Group winners and runners-ups will be advance to the second round, which will be drawn into two groups of four. Two best teams will be qualified to the semi-finals. Semi-finals and final will be played a single-legged fixtures. Two finalists will be promoted to Liga 1. All matches will be held and played behind closed doors.

The draw of the second format was held on 19 August 2020 virtually. The draw resulted in the following groups, but because of COVID-19 pandemic no single match has been played :

After failing to obtain government and police permissions for the umpteenth time, PSSI on 29 September 2020 announced the second postponement of the 2020 season of Liga 1 and Liga 2. This time the initial suspension had a one-month period. After the end date was reached, PSSI on 29 October 2020 declared the 2020 football seasons could not be held in 2020. There was an attempt to resume the 2020 season in 2021. However, on 15 January 2021, PSSI decided to cancel the 2020 season of all football competitions and declared them void.

See also
 2020 Liga 1
 2020 Liga 3
 2020 Piala Indonesia

References

Liga 2
Liga 2
Liga 2
Indonesia
Liga 2